Macquarie, until 1910 The Macquarie was an electoral district of the Legislative Assembly in the Australian state of New South Wales, created in 1894 and named after the Macquarie River. It was re-created in 1904, retaining nothing but the name, then abolished in 1920.

The district created in 1894 was at the upper reaches of the Macquarie River, from Oberon to Sofala, and was divided between Bathurst Blayney and Hartley. There was a significant re-distribution of electorates in 1904 as a result of the 1903 New South Wales referendum, which required the number of members of the Legislative Assembly to be reduced from 125 to 90. The member for The Macquarie from 1895 to 1904 was William Hurley (Progressive) who did not contest the 1904 election as he was appointed to the Legislative Council.

The district re-created in 1904 consisted of parts of the abolished seats of Dubbo and Wellington. The member for Dubbo was Simeon Phillips (Liberal Reform) unsuccessfully contested the election for The Macquarie. The member for Wellington was John Haynes (Liberal Reform) who unsuccessfully contested the election for Mudgee.

Members for Macquarie

Election results

Notes

References

Macquarie
Macquarie
1894 establishments in Australia
Macquarie
1920 disestablishments in Australia